Aurelio Cortés (1904 – death unknown) was a Cuban catcher in the Negro leagues between 1928 and 1935.

A native of Cienfuegos, Cuba, Cortés made his Negro leagues debut in 1928 with the Cuban Stars (West). He played three seasons with the club, then finished his career in 1935 with the Cuban Stars (East).

References

External links
 and Baseball-Reference Black Baseball stats and Seamheads

1904 births
Date of birth missing
Year of death missing
Place of death missing
Cuban Stars (East) players
Cuban Stars (West) players
Cuban baseball players
Baseball catchers
People from Cienfuegos